The American cooking television series Kelsey's Essentials aired on Cooking Channel from 2010 to 2016. A total of 69 episodes of the series aired over six seasons.

Episodes

Season 1 (2010–2011)

Season 2 (2011)

Season 3 (2012)

Season 4 (2012–2013)

Season 5 (2013)

Season 6 (2016)

Notes

References

External links
 
 

Lists of American non-fiction television series episodes
Lists of food television series episodes